Silver Sea is the second studio album by Méav Ní Mhaolchatha, released in 2002 by Celtic Collections. It was re-released on February 1, 2011 on MRI.

Track listing

Personnel
Musicians
David Agnew - Oboe
Máire Breatnach - Viola, violin
David James - Cello
Eunan McDonald - Bass, bass guitar
David Mckenna - Accordion
Méav - Vocals
Anne Marie O’Farrell - Harp
Conor O’Reilly - Piano
Colm Ó Snodaigh - Flute, low whistle, percussion
Rónán Ó Snodaigh - Bodhran
Rossa Ó Snodaigh - Percussion
Gavin Ralston - Guitar

Technical
Máire Breatnach - Producer
Brian Masterson - Engineer
Méav - Producer

References

2011 albums
Méav Ní Mhaolchatha albums
Albums by Irish artists